Talk to Me is a 2022 Australian supernatural horror film directed by Danny and Michael Philippou in their directorial debut, and written by Bill Hinzman, Daley Pearson, and Danny Philippou. It stars Sophie Wilde, Alexandra Jensen, Joe Bird, Otis Dhanji, Miranda Otto, Zoe Terakes and Chris Alosio.

Talk to Me had its preview screening at the 2022 Adelaide Film Festival and premiered at the 2023 Sundance Film Festival on 22 January 2023. It will be released in United States on 28 July 2023 by A24.

Premise 
"When a group of friends discover how to conjure spirits using an embalmed hand, they become hooked on the new thrill, until one of them goes too far and unleashes terrifying supernatural forces."

Cast 
 Sophie Wilde as Mia
 Alexandra Jensen as Jade
 Joe Bird as Riley
 Otis Dhanji as Daniel
 Miranda Otto as Sue
 Zoe Terakes as Hayley
 Chris Alosio as Joss

Release 
Talk to Me had a preview screening at the 2022 Adelaide Film Festival, and had its international premiere at the 2023 Sundance Film Festival in its midnight lineup. A24 acquired the North American distribution rights for the film following its screening at the Sundance festival. It also screened at South by Southwest (SXSW) from the 10th to 15th of March that the same year.

The film is scheduled to be released theatrically in the United States on 28 July 2023.

Reception 
On the review aggregator website Rotten Tomatoes, Talk to Me has an approval rating of 96% based on 50 reviews, with an average rating of 8/10. The site's consensus reads: "With a gripping story and impressive practical effects, Talk to Me spins a terrifically creepy 21st-century horror yarn built on classic foundations." On Metacritic, the film has a weighted average score of 72 out of 100, based on 9 critics, indicating "generally favorable reviews".

Damon Wise of Deadline Hollywood praised the film, writing, "though it employs some familiar tropes... [the film] does attempt to do something new with an old idea, for one thing making the crossing of infernal thresholds seem like an awful lot of fun." Chris Bumbray of Joblo also praised the film, writing, "The cast is terrific, with Wilde an appealing heroine. However, Joe Bird is best, with him perhaps delivering the best “possessed performance” since Linda Blair in The Exorcist," for which she was nominated for an Academy Award and two Golden Globes, winning one. Cassondra Feltus of Black Girl Nerds also applauded the film, writing, "The young actors give powerful performances, particularly Sophie Wilde."

David Rooney of The Hollywood Reporter praised the film, writing, "The movie deftly stitches its deepest fears around the idea that grief and trauma can be open invitations to predatory forces from the great beyond. It marks a welcome splash of new blood on the horror landscape." Rooney also applauded the performances, writing, "While the predominantly young cast is solid, especially Bird as Riley, talented newcomer Wilde does the heaviest dramatic lifting."

Chuck Bowen of Slant Magazine gave the film 3/4 stars, writing, "The film's major achievement is how it manages to ground possession in the reality of modern teenage life...The film has a free-floating, nearly intangible sense of unease that greatly serves it."

References

External links 
 Talk to Me at A24 Films
 

2022 films
2022 horror films
2022 directorial debut films
Australian supernatural horror films
2020s Australian films
2022 LGBT-related films
LGBT-related horror films